, also stylized as flying DOG, is a Japanese record label formerly known as the Victor Entertainment subsidiary M-serve (stylized as m-serve), founded in 1997. FlyingDog is a record label that specializes in the production of animation-related video and music software.

History
The FlyingDog trademark was first used by Victor Entertainment in 1976, when it created a record label focusing on the promotion of rock artists that existed through 1980. It was home to artists such as Panta, Maki Nomiya, Masaru Watanabe, and June Yamagishi. In 1997, Victor Entertainment created the subsidiary M-serve which, in 2007, became FlyingDog, a record label officially mandated for the production and promotion of animation-related releases.

Artists
 Yūka Aisaka
 Akino
 Akino Arai
 Yuki Kajiura
 Yoko Kanno
 Houko Kuwashima
 Maaya Sakamoto
 Shino Shimoji
 JUNNA
 Minori Suzuki
 Haruka Chisuga
 Nao Tōyama
 Megumi Nakajima
 Nano
 Yūka Nanri
 Shiena Nishizawa
 Iori Nomizu
 FictionJunction
 May'n
 Manami Numakura
 Kiyono Yasuno
 Minami
manzo

References

External links 

 

Victor Entertainment
Japanese record labels
Record labels established in 1997
Mass media companies based in Tokyo